Elaeocarpus subvillosus is a species of flowering plant in the Elaeocarpaceae family. It is found only in Sri Lanka.

References

subvillosus
Endemic flora of Sri Lanka
Vulnerable plants
Taxonomy articles created by Polbot